Woodchip may refer to:

 Woodchips, a medium-sized solid material
 Woodchipper, a machine
 Ingrain wallpaper, in home decoration